Han Aiping (April 22, 1962 – October 16, 2019) was a Chinese badminton player in the 1980s who ranks among the greats of the woman's game. Noted for her superb overhead strokes, she and her teammate, rival, and sometimes doubles partner Li Lingwei dominated international singles play for most of the decade, each winning the IBF World Championships twice, and led Chinese teams to victory in Uber Cup (women's world team) competitions.

Career

Early career 
Han Aiping began her badminton training at the age of 10 in the Wuhan Amateur Sports School. As a highly talented 12-year-old she joined the Hubei provincial team in 1974. In 1977 she finished second at the Chinese national championships and joined the National Chinese team at the age of 16 the following year. In the late 1970s, before China was admitted to the International Badminton Federation (now the Badminton World Federation), it promoted a rival organization, the World Badminton Federation which held its own version of a world championship in both 1978 and 1979. At just 17 Han won women's singles at the second of these. However, her meteoric rise was interrupted by health problems, and after being diagnosed with hyperthyroidism in 1980, on medical orders she was forced out of competition for two years. Resuming her badminton training late in 1982, she finished second at the next Chinese National Badminton Championships to another rising young star Li Lingwei. With China having been admitted to the IBF in 1981 Han and her teammates could now compete in all the major world events. In 1983 she won singles at the Japan Open and singles and women's doubles at the Badminton World Cup. At the 1983 World Championships Han defeated her top seeded compatriot Zhang Ailing in the semifinals but was defeated by an increasingly familiar opponent, Li Lingwei, in the finals.

Later career and rivalry with Li Lingwei 
Han Aiping and her compatriot Li Lingwei repeatedly faced each other in the singles finals of major international tournaments from 1983 through 1988. Li maintained a won/lost edge in this rivalry, and in three successive winning Uber Cup competitions (1984, 1986, and 1988) played first singles for China ahead of Han at second singles. However, when they faced each other in badminton's most prestigious events, Han was arguably very much Li's equal. For example, Han lost the final of the 1983 World Championship to Li, but defeated Li in their next World Championship showdown in 1987, after having won the previous 1985 World Championship when Li had suffered a rare semifinal defeat. They exchanged victories in two consecutive finals at the venerable All England Championships, badminton's oldest event, with Li winning in 1984, and Han winning in 1985, and also at the China Open which Han won in 1986 and Li won in 1987. Han also won their only meeting at the quadrennial Asian Games in 1986. Throughout their rivalry they remained good friends and were often successful women's doubles partners at a time  when, increasingly, elite singles players no longer entered doubles and elite doubles players no longer entered singles. In 1985 they captured women's doubles titles  at both the All Englands and World Championships. They won three women's doubles titles together at the now defunct Badminton World Cup in 1983, 1986, and 1987. At the 1987 World Championships where Han won her second consecutive world singles title, she and Li had to settle for silver in women's doubles, losing to their compatriots Lin Ying and Guan Weizhen in the finals.

By 1988 new young stars were emerging from China as well as from South Korea and Indonesia to challenge the Li/Han hegemony. In the exhibition tournament held at the 1988 Seoul Olympics which Li Lingwei did not contest, Han was upset in a close final by South Korea's Hwang Hye-Young. Though she won a number of events in her last two seasons of international play, occasionally Han was beaten by someone other than Li. In particular, China was relying on two young women, Tang Jiuhong and Huang Hua to take over for proven great players who were perhaps wearying of the training and tournament grind. In mid 1989 Han decided to end her playing career.

Achievements

Olympic Games (exhibition) 
Women's singles

World Championships 
Women's singles

Women's doubles

World Cup 
Women's singles

Women's doubles

Asian Games 
Women's singles

IBF Grand Prix (21 titles, 17 runners-up)
The World Badminton Grand Prix sanctioned by International Badminton Federation (IBF) from 1983 to 2006.

Women's singles

Women's doubles

Invitational tournament 
Women's singles

Women's doubles

Personal life 
After leaving the National Chinese badminton team Han and her husband Guo Ming went to Australia to study in March 1990. In April she was invited to give lectures in Japan's Olympic Intensification Program and then taught at the Suntory Badminton Club in Japan. In June 1994 she was reunited with her husband in Australia and cooperated with the local badminton club to train the team members to participate in the competition on behalf of the club. At the end of November 2002 she returned to China to serve as the head coach and head of the teaching and research team of the Hubei Badminton Women's Team. Dongfanghong Primary School, Qiaokou District, Wuhan City, established a badminton school named after her and officially unveiled this in September 2005. In 2013, she was elected at the 12th National Committee of the Chinese People's Political Consultative Conference.

Han Aiping and her husband Guo Ming had two daughters. They traveled to Japan and Australia with the children before returning to Wuhan, Hubei, to settle in 2002. Later, in order to better re-engage their daughters in the English language they sent them to Singapore. The elder daughter, Guo Yushan, conducted badminton training at a local club, while the second daughter, Han Yalu, went into tennis training.

Death 
Han was inducted into the Badminton Hall of Fame in 1998. She died on 16 October 2019 due to lung cancer at the age of 57.

References

External links
 
 
 

1962 births
2019 deaths
Badminton players from Wuhan
Chinese female badminton players
Badminton players at the 1988 Summer Olympics
Badminton players at the 1986 Asian Games
Asian Games gold medalists for China
Asian Games medalists in badminton
Medalists at the 1986 Asian Games
World No. 1 badminton players
Deaths from lung cancer
Deaths from cancer in the People's Republic of China
21st-century Chinese women
20th-century Chinese women